Dr. William B. Morgan is an American naval architect and renowned expert in propeller design.

Biography
Morgan was born in Mount Pleasant, Iowa, received his M.S. in Mechanics and Hydraulics 1951 from the University of Iowa, and a doctorate in Naval Architecture from the University of California, Berkeley, in 1961, and devoted his entire professional career to the Carderock Division (David Taylor Model Basin), Naval Surface Warfare Center, Bethesda, Maryland.

Morgan started working with UNIVAC I and UNIVAC II computers in 1954. He introduced computers into naval engineering and thereby revolutionized propeller design. He published numerous studies of sub-cavitating, super-cavitating, and contra-rotating propellers; annular airfoil and ducted propeller theory; propeller blade strength; hydrodynamic properties of blade sections; and propeller cavitation, ventilation and noise. Perhaps most significantly, he led development of the highly skewed propeller with its superior vibration and acoustic properties.

Morgan ultimately was named head of the hydromechanics directorate, David Taylor Model Basin, responsible for all hydromechanic research concerning U.S. Navy ships and submarines, and managing three hundred employees, a $70 million budget and Navy testing facilities estimated at almost $2 billion nationwide. He directed the acquisition of major facilities including the Maneuvering and Seakeeping Basin, Rotating Arm, 36-inch Variable Pressure Water Tunnel, and the Large Cavitation Channel (now named in his honor).

Morgan was given numerous awards from national and international technical societies, academia, and the Navy. He is the only U.S. citizen to receive the William Froude Medal from the Royal Institute of Naval Architects. In 1992, he was elected a member of the National Academy of Engineering for technical leadership improving performance, quieting, and design of advanced marine propulsion systems, and development of large modern propulsion testing facilities. In 1997 was awarded the Gibbs Brothers Medal by the National Academy of Sciences.

References 

 MarineLink biography
 Large Cavitation Channel

Morgan, William B.
Engineers from Iowa
Living people
Members of the United States National Academy of Engineering
American marine engineers
Year of birth missing (living people)